Cryosuction is the concept of negative pressure in freezing soil resulting from transformation of liquid water to ice in the soil pores whereby water migrates through soil pores to the freezing zone (through capillary action).

Fine-grained soils such as clays and silts enables greater negative pressures than more coarse-grained soils due to the smaller pore size. In periglacial environments, this mechanism is highly significant and it is the predominant process in ice lens formation in permafrost areas.
Several models for ice-lens formation by cryosuction exist, among others the Hydrodynamic model and the Pre-melting model, many of them based on the Clausius–Clapeyron relation with various assumptions, yielding cryosuction potentials of 11 to 12 atm per degree Celsius below zero depending on pore size.

See also 
 Pore water pressure
 Suction
 Permafrost

References 

Geography of the Arctic
Geomorphology
Hydrology